Biñan station (or Biñang station) is a railway station located on the South Main Line in Biñan, Laguna, Philippines.

The station, one of two train stations within the city, is the main station serving the city of Biñan, and was the terminus for Commuter Express trips between Metro Manila and its southern suburbs. Major landmarks near the station include Central Mall Biñan, Forest Lake Memorial Park, Olivarez Plaza, and the main campus of the University of Perpetual Help System JONELTA.

History
The section of the Main Line South from San Pedro to Biñan was opened on September 2, 1908. The station is the first railway station serving Biñan.

References

Philippine National Railways stations
Railway stations in Laguna (province)
Buildings and structures in Biñan